Coach Trip 14, also known as Coach Trip: Road to Ibiza, is the fourteenth series of Coach Trip in the United Kingdom, the series was moved to E4 compared to previously broadcast on Channel 4. The filming took place between May and July 2015, the series began airing 25 July 2016 for 30 episodes, concluding on 2 September 2016. The first set of seven couples were revealed on 19 July 2016.

On 23 August 2016, Channel 4 confirmed that a fifteenth series of Coach Trip had been commissioned with filming starting in October 2016.

Voting system
The Voting system on this series was:
  Days 1 to 26 was a yellow card
  Days 27 to 29 an automatic red card due to all couples canvassing for future votes before the vote on day 24

Similar system to Celebrity Coach Trip.

Contestants

Voting history

Notes
 Liam & Sam were banned from voting, but they were eligible to being voted for, due to them waking up late and ended up receiving a yellow card.

 Brendan changed the voting for this episode, everyone was able to vote as normal but at the end Brendan would choose whose vote counted. This vote was Danny and Faye's vote, resulting in Amber and George receiving their second yellow card followed by their red card.

 Brendan stated that the winner of the afternoon challenge would be immune from the vote.

 After the voting had taken place, Tash received a call from her work. Which resulted in the couple having to leave the coach.

 On Day 8, Enzo & Michelina left the coach due to personal reasons directly before the vote. Danny & Faye and Dylan & Matt won a paddleboarding race, and were awarded immunity for the vote. With the exception of Rochelle & Alex, who were new to the coach, all other contestants chose to refuse to vote. Due to their choice, all five couples were awarded red cards, including the two couples who were immune.

 Due to everyone on the coach are new, they are all immune from votes which resulted in no votes being made and therefore Brendan cancelled the vote.

 On Day 15 the couples were voting for their most popular couple to win a three-day immunity pass from the vote, Alex & Rochelle and Josh & Liam tied on 2 votes and the rest of the group decided to give Alex & Rochelle immunity until Day 19.

 After the first activity of the day Ashleigh & Debbie received a phone call from their work, which meant that they had to leave to coach to head back home.

 Brendan had received news from Josh & Liam, so he went to speak to them. They informed Brendan that they had to leave the coach as they were needed back at work.

 Brendan announced that tonights vote was a double yellow vote. Every couple had to vote for two couples, the two couples with the highest votes would receive a yellow card.

 Brendan announced that the voting from tonight would change. Which ever couple got the most votes would receive instant red card due to all couples canvassing for future votes on day 24. The system was similar to Celebrity Coach Trip.

The Trip by Day

References

2016 British television seasons
Coach Trip series
Television shows set in France
Television shows set in Italy
Television shows set in Spain